Mademoiselle and Her Gang (French: Mademoiselle et son gang) is a 1957 French comedy film directed by Jean Boyer and starring Line Renaud, Noël Roquevert and Philippe Nicaud.

It was shot at the Billancourt Studios in Paris. The film's sets were designed by the art director Robert Giordani.

Synopsis
Agnès Bourdieux the daughter of a police inspector, and a successful crime novelist under a male pseudonym, becomes leader of an inept gang of criminals.

Cast
 Line Renaud as Agnès Bourdieux
 Noël Roquevert as L'inspecteur Bourdieux
 Philippe Nicaud as Paul
 Jean-Jacques Delbo as O'Connor
 Georgette Anys as Gravos
 Paul Bonifas as La patron du bistrot
 Louis Bugette as Jojo
 René-Louis Lafforgue as La Fourchette 
 Max Elloy as Victor
 Jack Ary as Émile l'Africain - le troisième truand 
 Henri Garcin as L'ami snob de Christian
 Raymond Gérôme as L'avocat
 André Dalibert as Marcel 
 Sylvia Lopez as Marie-Christine

References

Bibliography 
 Phil Powrie & Robynn Jeananne Stilwell. Changing Tunes: The Use of Pre-existing Music in Film. Ashgate Publishing, 2006.

External links 
 

1957 films
French comedy films
1957 comedy films
1950s French-language films
Films directed by Jean Boyer
Films shot at Billancourt Studios
1950s French films